Xyroptila peltastes is a moth of the family Pterophoridae. It is found in Australia.

Original description

External links
Australian Faunal Directory
Image at Flickr
Xyroptila peltastes at Trin Wiki

Moths of Australia
peltastes
Moths described in 1908